Alternate Concepts, Inc. (ACI) is a transit management company within the United States. It is currently headquartered in Boston, Massachusetts and provides services to four rail authorities. Between 2003 and 2014, ACI also operated the Massachusetts Bay Transportation Authority's commuter rail system. Additionally, Alternate Concepts is planned to operate MTA Maryland's Purple Line.

History 
Alternate Concepts was founded in 1989 by three former employees of the Massachusetts Bay Transportation Authority, James F. O’Leary, Richard Brown and Jane Daly.

Operations 
Alternate Concepts currently manages and operates the following rail services:

 Current
 CTrail Hartford Line (a joint venture between ACI and TransitAmerica Services)
 RTD Commuter Rail
 Tren Urbano
 Valley Metro Rail
 Former
 MBTA Commuter Rail
 Future
 MTA Maryland Purple Line

References 

Railway companies of the United States
Massachusetts railroads
Railway companies established in 1989
1989 establishments in Massachusetts